William Anderson Handley (December 15, 1834 – June 23, 1909) was a U.S. Representative from Alabama.

Born at Liberty Hill, near Franklin, Georgia, Handley moved to Alabama.
He attended the public schools.
He moved to Roanoke, Alabama.
During the Civil War served in the Confederate States Army as captain of the Twenty-fifth Regiment.
He engaged in mercantile pursuits.

Handley was elected as a Democrat to the Forty-second Congress (March 4, 1871 – March 3, 1873).
He served in the State senate 1888-1892.
He served as delegate to the State constitutional convention in 1901.
He served as member of the State house of representatives 1903-1907.
He resumed his former mercantile activities.
He died in Roanoke, Alabama, June 23, 1909.
He was interred in the City Cemetery.

References

External links 
 

1834 births
1909 deaths
People from Roanoke, Alabama
Confederate States Army officers
Democratic Party members of the United States House of Representatives from Alabama
19th-century American politicians